Harold Weeks (1893–1967) was an American jazz musician.

Harold Weeks may also refer to:
 Harold E. Weeks (c. 1890–1939), American politician from Maine
 Harold Weeks (1893–1967), American jazz musician and composer from Seattle, Washington.
 Harold J. Week (1884–1936), American politician and businessman
 Harold Weekes (1880–1950), American college football player